Benjamin Balleret (born 15 January 1983) is a professional tennis player from Monaco. His father, Bernard Balleret, is former tennis player, while his cousin Arthur Rinderknech also plays the sport professionally. Balleret is a member of the Monaco Davis Cup team.

Tennis career

Juniors
As a junior Balleret reached as high as No. 19 in the junior world singles rankings (and No. 29 in doubles) in 2001.

Pro tour
Balleret is best known for his April 2006 fairy tale run to the third round of the Monte Carlo Open, an ATP Masters Series. Entering the tournament, he was ranked 351st in the world and had competed only in challenger tournaments and several Davis Cup matches (he played for the Monegasque team in 2004 and 2005 and compiled a modest record of 4 wins and 5 losses). However, on 16 April 2006, he received a wild card into the qualifying draw of the Monte Carlo Open and won upsets over seeded, far more accomplished players than he including clay court specialist Albert Portas (at the time ranked 106th in the world and seeded 13th in the qualifying draw) as well as U.S. Open and Wimbledon semi-finalist Jonas Björkman (at the time ranked 71st in the world and seeded third in the qualifying draw). These wins earned Balleret a spot in the main draw, and his performance there is what earned him international headlines. He won upsets over Christophe Rochus (at the time ranked 44th in the world) and Sébastien Grosjean (at the time ranked 23rd in the world, number one in France, and seeded thirteenth in the main draw). Balleret's impressive run came to an end in the third round, in which he lost to world number one Roger Federer.

After Balleret's performance at this prestigious clay court event, he shot up 134 positions in the rankings to World No. 217.

In 2013, Balleret and Guillaume Couillard played the longest professional tiebreak in known tennis history, lasting 70 points (36–34). Balleret won the match 7–6(34), 6–1 in the third qualifying round for the USA F1 Futures in Plantation, Florida. He won the Pensacola Futures tournament in 2013.

References

External links
 
 
 
 
 
 Balleret Recent Match Results
 Balleret World Ranking History
 Monaco Men Recent Match Results

1983 births
Living people
Monegasque male tennis players
Monegasque people of French descent
People from Monte Carlo